Marion Public Library may refer to:

Marion Public Library (Marion, Ohio), a Carnegie Library in Marion, Ohio
Marion Public Library (Marion, Indiana), a Carnegie Library in Marion, Indiana